Chaitophorinae is a subfamily of aphids in the family Aphididae. There are about 12 genera and more than 180 described species in Chaitophorinae.

Genera

Tribe: Chaitophorini
 Chaitogenophorus Zhang, Qiao & Chen, 1999
 Chaitophorus Koch, 1854
 Lambersaphis
 Periphyllus Hoeven, 1863 (maple aphids)
 Pseudopterocomma MacGillivray, 1963
 Trichaitophorus Takahashi, 1937
 Yamatochaitophorus Higuchi, 1972

Tribe: Siphini
 Atheroides Haliday, 1839
 Caricosipha Börner, 1939
 Chaetosiphella Hille Ris Lambers, 1939
 Laingia Theobald, 1922
 Sipha Passerini, 1860

References

 
Hemiptera subfamilies